Articles on North Korean films include:

 Cinema of North Korea
 List of North Korean films